Liolaemus puna is a species of lizard in the family Iguanidae.  It is found in Argentina, Chile, and Bolivia.

References

puna
Lizards of South America
Reptiles of Argentina
Reptiles of Chile
Reptiles of Bolivia
Reptiles described in 2004